Sant'Elia Fiumerapido is a town and comune in the province of Frosinone, in the Latin Valley, in the Lazio region of central Italy.

The composer Giuseppe Bozzelli was born in Sant'Elia Fiumerapido in 1841. Part of the motion picture, The Devil's Brigade, was filmed there in 1967.

References

Cities and towns in Lazio